is a role-playing video game developed by Gust Co. Ltd. in 2007 for the PlayStation 2. The game is the ninth entry to Gust's Atelier series, and incorporates elements of standard turn-based combat and alchemy. A PlayStation Portable version was released which included additional features.

Gameplay
Mana Khemia shares many common elements with its predecessors, the Atelier Iris trilogy.

At the core of the game is alchemy through which the player can create weapons, armor, usable items, and complex ingredients for these recipes. The player is required to gather core materials through field exploration, spoils of combat, or by purchasing them in the shops. Each item carries fundamental properties that include elemental and special abilities, and character stat improvements, that can be infused into equipment. Through the creation of new items, these properties can transfer over into the new item. A new "alchemy wheel" allows the player to adjust the quality of each ingredient as it is added to the mix, for better or worse, in order to alter the final item's properties as well. Recipes for items are learned over the course of the game by finding or buying recipe books, conversing with characters, or can be extrapolated from existing recipes by altering the ingredients list.

When in the field, the player can opt to avoid encounters with monsters by running and jumping over them, but also may attempt to strike first to go into battle. Mana Khemia uses a turn-based system similar to previous Atelier Iris games. Once the player has more than three characters in the party, he or she can then have up to three characters in reserve; these characters can switch in during a normal turn, or be called in at the end of one character's attack to provide an additional blow, or be called in to replace a character about to be attacked. The swapped out characters require a number of turns to recover before being called in again. As the player becomes able to inflict more damage, they can activate "Burst Mode" that temporarily increases the damage from each attack; this mode rewards the player with a large number of hits. Additionally, about mid-game, Burst Mode can lead to a "Finishing Burst" that requires the player to meet a certain condition while Burst Mode is activated, such as striking with each team member, or healing a certain amount of damage; this allows for a special powerful finishing move to be unleashed by one of the characters.

Both alchemy and combat are necessary to grow the characters.  Unlike typical role-playing games, there are no experience points or characters levels. Instead, through combat, characters earn "action points" which are used in the character-specific "grow book" to unlock new skills, and character bonuses such as additional health or mana points. However, these bonuses are tied to completing the recipes for specific items in that book. The grow book is presented as a graph of synthesizable items. The bonuses for an item cannot be acquired using action points until an adjacent item on the graph, and the item itself, has been made.

The game is presented as a series of terms at a school. Each term is made up of several weeks, typically starting and ending with an event, ultimately leading to a key battle to be won. In between, the player is generally required to complete two or three courses, earning a grade depending on how well the course was completed. This is then followed by two or three days of free time. If the player should fail to make a decent cumulative grade by the end of courses, they will need to spend one day of free time in detention, doing required tasks. Once in free time, the player is free to take odd jobs, talk with characters, and perform side quests related to the other members of the party.

Plot
The game's main focus is on the lead protagonist, Vayne Aurelius, the son of a legendary alchemist named Theofratus who had disappeared sometime after Vayne's birth. Since then, Vayne has led the life of a hermit, his only companion being a Mana in cat form named Sulpher.  Vayne is invited to the Al-Revis Academy for alchemy training by Zeppel, one of the professors. He is quickly indoctrinated into the school by becoming part of an atelier led by Flay Gunnar (an older student who is known as The Defender of Justice) along with two other students, Jess (a clumsy girl who is nevertheless adept at alchemy), and Nikki (an impulsive beastgirl). They are soon joined by Pamela (the school's resident ghost), Anna (an 11-year-old master swordsman), Roxis (the son of a famous family of alchemists who is quickly forced to join the workshop by Flay), and Muppy (an alien the group discovers on an assignment). The eight of them are able to succeed at completing assignments, learn the skills of alchemy, and allow the workshop to prosper.

Characters

Playable characters

Vayne is the protagonist and main character, who lives alone deep in the forest with Sulpher, a black cat. Suddenly one day, he is  invited to come to Al-Revis Academy, supposedly because he is the son of a famous alchemist. He is shy and has a weak personality, and his friends talk him into trouble. He performs several miraculous acts as the game progresses, and it is eventually revealed that he is an artificial Mana, created by his famous alchemist father, who is able to grant wishes. Depending on his relationship with others, he will either continue to live on knowing that he is the Mana of wishes, or choose to disappear from the world. In all the good endings, Vayne eventually saves his friends and the school by wishing his power away.

Vayne's classmate, Jessica, fears no one. She has a very friendly and outgoing personality, but is slightly klutzy. She loves alchemy, and tests her strangely unique syntheses whenever she has the time, always causing something to explode. Since she was little, she had a strange illness that no doctors could fix until the legendary alchemist, Theofratus, managed to cure her. He made a mistake in the process and, as a result, her life expectancy has been greatly reduced. In her ending, Vayne becomes her doctor, working to cure her along with the other members of her workshop. Her bag appears to be some kind of magical device, akin to a bag of holding, however she is also able to pull out items that were never placed inside.

Vayne's schoolmate Flay is one year his senior. He is known throughout the school as a troublemaker. On Orientation Day, he forced Vayne to join his workshop, along with Jess and Nikki. As long as he is having fun, he does not care about anyone else's troubles. He also loves an adventurous, non-boring world. He always wants to be a 'King of Justice' aka a Superhero, and drags Vayne with him as his partner hero. In his ending, Flay has become a villain (though most likely a playful one) named the "Flayvor of Evil" in the U.S. version, and Vayne is the hero who continually battles with him.

An energetic beastman girl, Nikki talks and acts before she thinks. She hates sitting still inside a room, so she does not concentrate on her syntheses. She is too lazy to be in the academy, because she hates doing assignments. She grew up in a small village, which may be why she sometimes seems to lack common social ideas. However, out of all of the members of the workshop, she has the most common sense. Nikki has a beautiful singing voice and came to Al-Revis to find a husband so she can save her vanishing race. In her ending, she and Vayne get married and take care of their children.

A cool, sarcastic transfer student who comes from a famous alchemist family, Roxis is a very diligent, hard worker. His words are very polite, even though he is an annoying student. His hobbies are studying and reading. He likes being alone, and has an air about him that distances himself from others. He sees Vayne as a rival, and dislikes him. In his ending, Vayne and Roxis are sparring partners; the loser of each round is forced to be the other's test subject for all sorts of experiments.

A ghost girl who lives in Al-Revis, Pamela is very soft and likes all cute things. She is a recurring character in the Atelier series having previously appeared in Atelier Judie, Atelier Viorate, Atelier Iris: Eternal Mana and Atelier Iris 3: Grand Phantasm. She decides to join Vayne's workshop, but as soon as she sees how bleak it looks, she begins to complain about being in such a plain environment. With no other choice, Vayne gathers the cute items that Pamela wants, and decorates the workshop with them. In her ending, Pamela leaves Al-Revis with Vayne (now a doctor) to travel with him from town to town, though she does not stop her habit of scaring people. Later she appears in Atelier Rorona: The Alchemist of Arland, Atelier Totori: The Adventurer of Arland, Atelier Meruru: The Apprentice of Arland, Trinity Universe and Atelier Sophie: The Alchemist of the Mysterious Book.

Anna is a very young girl who has already mastered swordsmanship at her young age. She is an underclassman of Vayne, but is more mature than she looks. She is strict, fastidious, and takes most things far too seriously. She jokes at the results of her occasional wild speculations. Once she is set on a path, she is unstoppable. In her ending, Vayne meets her for a duel only to find that she now uses both alchemy and swords as part of her fighting style so she will happily use bombs and poisons on him.

Muppy is a foreign exchange student from a faraway world. By a strange turn of events, he ends up learning alchemy with Vayne and his workshop friends. He wanders the school in a pot-like machine, so everyone thinks he is slightly strange. His true plan is world domination as he tends to have delusions of grandeur. In his ending, Vayne travels with him to his home planet and asks Vayne to become his queen.

Non-playable characters

Sulpher is Vayne and Mana's companion who transforms into Vayne's weapon in combat. Sulpher normally takes on the form of an arm-mounted blade with a red eye, but can change his shape to perform other attacks. Sulpher is apathetic, rude, and seemingly unimpressed by everything. He traveled alongside Theofratus until the day he died, then became friends with Vayne. (He could talk with Vayne, but he now cannot since Vayne has lost his powers). In fact, Sulpher is not a Mana, he is a normal cat. Vayne is the Mana while Sulpher himself is the contractor, able to take the forms he does simply because Vayne wishes it.

A female teacher at the academy, Isolde is Theofratus' lover. She is less pleasant than the other teachers, often giving out more difficult assignments. She is a graduate of Al-Revis and was classmates with Zeppel. While Zeppel is the laid back teacher, Isolde is much more serious. She cares for Vayne while on the other hand hates him for killing Theofratus.

Vayne's homeroom teacher, Zeppel is friendly to students and is a popular teacher. He found Vayne in the mountains and invited him to the academy. In Mana Khemia 2 he has become the principal of Al-Revis Academy

An older student at the academy who is exclusively seen with Renee, Tony seems to be the less powerful of the two. He hates Gunnar with a passion, and considers him his rival. However, his attempts to defeat him, and the main party, are usually met by exasperation. ("Who are these people?" "We don't have time to play with you!") Gunnar tends to just ignore or make fun of him, and as the game progresses, it becomes obvious that he is much less evil than he originally appeared. He angers easily, which makes his speech deteriorate, and causes him to him make rash decisions. He is ordered by Isolde to watch over Vayne. He returns to the academy in Mana Khemia 2 to become a full-time teacher, if only to continue his grudge against Gunnar.

Renee, an older academy student is seen exclusively with Tony and goes along with his bothering Vayne, but it seems her heart is not really in it. Whenever Tony makes up 'schemes' to defeat Vayne's company, she will neither stop nor encourage him. She barely has any interests in anything, and tends to become bored quickly by all kinds of activity. She also seems to be very powerful in combat, as Tony asks her help to beat up Flay in the beginning of the game. (But she prefers to back off to avoid breaking her new nails, and Tony decides against fighting Flay alone). The fact that she is capable of summoning the Mana who hates humans, Azure Flame Mana, may prove that she is a more formidable battler than she appears. Still, she will only fight seriously occasionally, so that she is not much of a threat to Vayne and the others.

Tieck is the academy's principal, and a jovial man who is nice to all students. He is also a great cook.

The academy's vice-principal. She is very strict, and bullies the principal. She is also hopeless at baking.

Melanie is the academy's nurse and runs the infirmary and sells a variety of healing products. She enjoys teasing Vayne and his friends.

Lorr is the academy's combat and tactics trainer. He is a beastman like Nikki.

Soundtrack
The soundtrack was composed by Ken Nakagawa and Daisuke Achiwa and includes opening song "Run For Your Life"' by Haruka Shimotsuki and ending song "TOGGLE" by Yuuki Mizusawa.. It was released May 30, 2007 in Japan by Team Entertainment.

Disc 1, Tracks:
1. "Run for your Life" (also on Japanese release)    
2. "Nostalgic School House" ( なつかしき学び舎よ ) 
3. "The Dream of the Black Cat" ( 黒猫の見た夢 ) 
4. "A Boy's Worries" ( 少年の悩み ) 
5. "To the Future of Dreams" (Chorus Version) ( 夢の未来へ~合唱版~ )  
6. "The Day We Met, the Moment We Parted" ( 出会いの日、別れの刻 ) 
7. "Welcome to the Magic Workshop"  ( ようこそ魔法の工房へ ) 
8. "The Ally of Justice Has Arrived"  ( 正義の味方がやってきた ) 
9. "Homeroom"  ( ホームルーム ) 
10. "Town of Clear Skies" ( 晴天の街 ) 
11. "Pulse"  ( 鼓動 ) 
12. "Splendid Force" (also on Japanese release) 
13. "Victorious High Touch"  ( 勝利のハイタッチ ) 
14. "Nice Work"  ( おつかれさ～ん )  
15. "Result Announcement"  ( 結果発表 ) 
16. "Vayne and His Pleasant Friends"  ( ヴェインと愉快な仲間たち ) 
17. "Whistling Girl"  ( 口笛少女 ) 
18. "Welcome to the Magic Workshop"  ( ようこそ魔法の工房へ~ほのぼのアレンジ )  
19. "The Store Lady & Old Man Medley"  ( 購買部のおねいさん＆おぢさんメドレー ) 
20. "Wind Banquet"  ( 風の宴 ) 
21. "Pitch Black"  ( 漆黒 ) 
22. "Hurry Up!" (also on Japanese release) 
23. "The Menace" (also on Japanese release) 
24. "Takedown of Defeat"  ( 敗北のテイクダウン ) 
25. "Taking the Unknown Route"  ( 知らない道を行こう ) 
26. "Ah, Discipline Committee of Youth"  ( 嗚呼、青春の風紀委員 ) 
27. "Stupid Hair Saga"  ( アホ毛サーガ ) 
28. "Legend of Feigned Ignorance"  ( オトボケ伝説 ) 
29. "Let's Try Even Harder"  ( もっとがんばりましょう ) 
30. "Tick Away! Rhythm of Time"  ( 刻め！時のリズム ) 
31. "Sailbird" (also on Japanese release) 
32. "Hallucinate Bell" (also on Japanese release) 
33. "Today's the School Festival"  ( 今日は学園祭 ) 
34. "A Friend's Hand" ( 友達の手 ) 
35. "To the Future of Dreams"  ( 夢の未来へ ) 
36. "Sirius"  ( シリウス ) by Marie

Disc Length: 66 mins 30 sec

Disc 2, Tracks

1. "Nee" ( ねぇ) by Marie 
2. "Onto the Next Step Part 1"  ( 次なるステップへ その１ )
3. "Grasshopper"  (also on Japanese release)
4. "Absorbed by the Glasses" ( メガネが耽る )
5. "Crystalized"  (also on Japanese release)
6. "Together with New Friends"  ( 新たな仲間と共に )
7.  "A Rusted Neigh"  ( 錆びついた嘶き )
8.  "Looming Conspiracy"  ( 迫り来る陰謀 )
9. "Running Shadow"  ( 奔る影  )
10. "Riding on the Winds Crossing over the Hills"  ( 丘を越える風に乗って )
11. "Mansion of Slumbering Wisdom" ( 叡智眠りし館 )
12. "Hateful Mana-Khemialchemy"  ( ウラメシマナケミアルケミー )
13. "Ghost Girl for Mana-Khemia" ( 幽霊少女 for マナケミア )
14. "Repulsion"  (also on Japanese release)
15. "Gavotte"  ( がぼっと )
16. "Memorial of Time"  ( 刻の碑 
17. "A Treasure Obtained"  ( 手に入れた財宝 )
18. "The Life of Paon"  ( パオーン列伝 )
19. "Rectangular Wave of Love"  ( 愛の矩形波 )
20. "Memories of the Great Tree"  ( 巨樹の記憶 )
21. "Disrupter"  (also on Japanese release)   
22. "Sunset"  ( 夕茜 )
23. "Onto the Next Step Part 2"  ( 次なるステップへ その２ )
24. "Flowers Blooming in the Empty Sky"  ( 虚空に咲く花 )
25. "A Smile of Ice"  ( 氷の微笑 )
26. "Nefertiti"  (also on Japanese release)
27. "Silent Queasiness"  ( 静かな眩暈 0
28. "Laments of the Rain"  ( 雨の慟哭 )
29. "The Voice of Darkness that Comes from the Abyss"  ( 闇の声、深淵より )
30. "One More Demise"  ( もう一つの終焉 )
31. "A Gap to the Darkness"  ( 闇への間隙 )
32. "With Power and Light in my Hands"  ( この手に光と力を )
33. "STIGMATA"  by Noriko Mitose  (also on Japanese release)
34. "At the Side of an Illusion"  ( 幻想の畔 )
35. "TOGGLE"  (also on Japanese release)

Disc Length: 71 mins. 29 secs.

Reception

The game received "average" reviews according to the review aggregation website Metacritic. In Japan, Famitsu gave it a score of 31 out of 40.

Re-release
A port for the PSP system that was released in Japan on September 25, 2008 under the title , and in North America on March 10, 2009, branded under the name Mana Khemia: Student Alliance. There are added features like multiplayer battles, Jump Start function to allow the game to load faster, and more items that can be synthesized. In multiplayer battles, enemies may drop rare items that cannot be found in the main game.

Reception

Student Alliance received "unfavorable" reviews, moreso than its PS2 counterpart, according to Metacritic. This was due to its additional loading times, but this can be remedied by playing the download rather than the UMD or using the install function.

Sequel

A sequel was released on May 29, 2008 in Japan and in North America on August 25, 2009. Its story is set 15 years after the original game, and the only returning characters are Flay, Tony, and Zeppel.

Notes

References

External links
 

2007 video games
Gust Corporation games
Japanese role-playing video games
Nippon Ichi Software games
PlayStation 2 games
PlayStation Portable games
School-themed video games
Video games developed in Japan
Atelier (video game series)